Tingena compsogramma is a species of moth in the family Oecophoridae. It is endemic to New Zealand and has been observed in the North and South Islands. This species inhabits native forest and adults are on the win from December until March.

Taxonomy 

This species was first described by Edward Meyrick in 1920 using specimens collected by George Hudson along the Buller River in December and named Borkhausenia compsogramma. George Hudson discussed and illustrated this species under the same name in his 1928 publication The butterflies and moths of New Zealand. In 1988 J. S. Dugdale placed this species in the genus Tingena. The male lectotype specimen is held at the Natural History Museum, London.

Description

Meyrick described this species as follows:
This species is variable in the intensity of its forewing markings and as well as ground colour. It is similar in appearance to T. chrysogramma but is distinct.

Distribution 
This species is endemic to New Zealand and has been observed in the North Island, including at Mount Ruapehu and at Kaitoke, and in the South Island, including in Otago at the Humboldt Range, Lake Wakatipu and at the Hunter Mountains.

Behaviour 
Adults of this species are on the wing from December until March.

Habitat 
This species inhabits native forests often at altitude.

References

Oecophoridae
Moths of New Zealand
Moths described in 1920
Endemic fauna of New Zealand
Taxa named by Edward Meyrick
Endemic moths of New Zealand